Pikk Hermann or Tall Hermann is a tower of the Toompea Castle, on Toompea hill in Tallinn, the capital of Estonia. The first part was built 1360–70. It was rebuilt (height brought to ) in the 16th century. A staircase with 215 steps leads to the top of the tower. The tower consists of ten internal floors and a viewing platform at the top.

While it is lowered, the song "Mu isamaa on minu arm" (My Fatherland is My Love) is heard. For the first time, the flag was raised to the top of Pikk Hermann at three o'clock in the afternoon of December 12, 1918 after the independence of Estonia. The Soviet troops who later occupied Estonia lowered the flag from the tower in the summer of 1940 and later replaced it with the flag of the Estonian Soviet Socialist Republic. The original flag was raised back on the tower on February 24, 1989. Since then, raising the flag to the top of the tower is one of the traditions of Estonia's Independence Day.

The Estonian flag was also briefly raised over the Pikk Hermann during  Otto Tief's brief interim government of Sept 18-22, 1944.

References

Buildings and structures completed in 1370
Towers completed in the 14th century
Towers in Estonia
Buildings and structures in Tallinn
Kesklinn, Tallinn
Gothic architecture in Estonia
Fortified towers
Round towers
Tallinn Old Town